Pristin V was the first and only official sub-group of South Korean girl group Pristin, formed by Pledis Entertainment in 2018. It was composed of five Pristin members: Nayoung, Roa, Eunwoo, Rena, and Kyulkyung.

History

2018: Debut with Like a V
On May 17, Pledis Entertainment released a teaser confirming that Pristin would be debuting its first sub-unit. Soon after both individual and group teasers began to be released, along with the title of their debut single album Like a V. On May 28, their first single album was released, along with the music video of the leading track in the album, "Get It".

Members
 Nayoung
 Roa
 Eunwoo
 Rena
 Kyulkyung

Discography

Single albums

Singles

Other charted songs

Filmography

Music videos

Notes

References

External links

  

Pristin
Pledis Entertainment artists
Produce 101 contestants
K-pop music groups
Musical groups established in 2018
South Korean girl groups
South Korean pop music groups
South Korean dance music groups
Musical groups from Seoul
2018 establishments in South Korea